WKMZ is a News/Talk/Sports formatted broadcast radio station licensed to Salem, West Virginia, serving Clarksburg and Weston in West Virginia. WKMZ is owned and operated by West Virginia Radio Corporation.

References

External links
Talk Radio 103.3 WKMZ Online

1999 establishments in West Virginia
News and talk radio stations in the United States
Sports radio stations in the United States
Radio stations established in 1999
KMZ (FM)